Airon-Saint-Vaast is a commune in the Pas-de-Calais department in northern France.

Geography
A small village situated some 19 miles (30 km) south of Boulogne-sur-Mer, on the D143E1 road

Population

Sights
 The church, built in 1877, in Neo-Gothic style.
 The chapel de Bavemont, built in 1809. This is where Saint Josse is said to have restored the sight of a little girl (Juliule), on his return from a pilgrimage to Rome in 665. In memory of this, a pilgrimage takes place at Whitsuntide.
 The chateau and its park.

See also
Communes of the Pas-de-Calais department

References

Communes of Pas-de-Calais